Keeps Us Off the Streets is the debut album by British glam rock band Hello, released in 1976.

Track listing

Personnel
Hello
Bob Bradbury - lead vocals and backing vocals, rhythm guitar
Keith Marshall - lead guitar and backing vocals
Vic Faulkner - bass
Jeff Allen - drums
Technical
John Dyer - art direction
Bob Searles - design
Roy Round - photography
Jean Junction - jeans

References

1976 debut albums
Bell Records albums